Joris Harteveld (born 2 July 1968) is a Namibian professional racing cyclist. In 2010 he won the Namibian National Road Race Championships.

References

External links
 
 

1968 births
Living people
Namibian male cyclists
People from Gobabis